Rule the World (Chinese: 独步天下) is a 2017 Chinese television series based on the novel Du Bu Tian Xia  by Li Xin. It stars Raymond Lam and Tang Yixin alongside Zhang Rui, Jing Gangshan, Li Zhinan and Qu Chuxiao. The series started airing on Tencent Video from 30 November 2017 at 20:00 (CST).

Synopsis
Bu Youran, a novelist, finds herself drawn to the story of Dongge who is known as the most beautiful woman among the Jurchen people. Dongge has been hailed as someone who can make or break a nation and becomes the centre of power struggles of many men. For political reasons, her brother presents her to Nurhaci as a gift. She also has to face Cuyen's advances, Daišan's  gentler tendencies, Dorgon's unruliness and Hong Taiji's incomparable love. Dongge eventually develops a relationship with Hong Taiji, despite being ten years older than him.

Cast

Main 
Raymond Lam as Aisin Gioro Hong Taiji 
Nurhaci's eighth son. He is domineering but considerate, but is devoted in love. Fully bestowed with Dongge. 
Tang Yixin as Bu Youran / Yehe Nara Buxiyamala (Dongge) / Borjigit Buyouran
Princess of the Yehe Nara clan and the world's most beautiful woman. She is unafraid of going after her heart and is devoted in love. 
Zhang Rui as Aisin Gioro Daišan
Nurhaci's second son. He is known for his accomplishments on the battlefield. He is gentle, peace-loving and has high endurance. He loves Dongge but his feelings were never reciprocated.

Supporting

Jin Imperial Clan
Jing Gangshan as Aisin Gioro Nurhaci
A prominent chieftain of the Aisin Gioro clan. He is ambitious, courageous and calm. Despite his power and authority, he failed to win Dongge's heart, for he values his empire over love. 
Xu Rongzhen as Fuca Gundei
Second primary consort of Nurhaci, birth mother of Manggultai. 
Lu Meifang as Hamin
Li Ang as Aisin Gioro Surhaci 
Nurhaci's brother. 
Wang Kaiyi as Aisin Gioro Cuyen
Nurhaci's eldest son. He is cold, overbearing and unrestrained. He is deeply in love with Dongge.
Zhou Xiaoqin as Jiyue
Daisan's wife.
Li Donghe as Aisin Gioro Manggūltai
Nurhaci's fifth son. 
Qu Chuxiao as Aisin Gioro Dorgon 
Nurhaci's fourteenth son. Having handled both civil and strategic affairs, he possesses both wits and braveness and is known for his brilliant military strategies.   
Huang Deyi as Aisin Gioro Dodo 
Nurhaci's fifteenth son. He specializes in military affairs. 
Liu Haikuan as Aisin Gioro Jirgalang 
Nurhaci's nephew. He was adopted by Nurhaci since young, and groomed to become a powerful chieftain. 
Liu Liansu as Aisin Gioro Yoto 
Daisan's eldest son. 
Mao Hangqi as Aisin Gioro Sahaliyan 
Daisan's third son.
Du Yilong as Aisin Gioro Hooge 
Hong Taiji's eldest son.

Ula Nara Clan 
Yan Zidong as Ula Nara Bujantai 
Chieftain of the Ula Nara clan. He has a marriage contract with Dongge.
Huang Sihan as Ula Nara Gedai 
Abahai's aunt. Secondary consort of Hong Taiji, birth mother of Hooge. She was Dongge's personal maid and the two value each other like sisters.
Chen Xinyu as Ula Nara Abahai
Niece of Bujantai. Fourth primary consort of Nurhaci, birth mother of Dorgon and Dodo.

Yehe Nara Clan
Shu Yaxin as Yehe Nara Buyanggu 
Chieftain of Yeha Nara clan. Dongge's older brother.
Li Linfei as Yehe Nara Sutai
Wudana's older sister. She married Jirgalang after her sister's death. She is friendly and easygoing.
Chen Jinyao as Yehe Nara Wudana 
Granddaughter of Gintaisi, chieftain of the Yehe Nara clan. Wife of Jirgalang. She is gentle, kind and persistent in love.

Borjigit Clan
Wang Yanhui as Borjigit Jerjer 
Daughter of Manggusi, chieftain of the Borjigit clan. She later becomes empress to Hong Taiji's regime.
Cao Mengge as Borjigit Bumbutai

Warka Clan
Li Zhinan as Wukeya
Xia Nan as Adanzhu
Wukeya's younger sister.

Others 
Tang Peiyan as Akdun 
Nurhaci's personal guard. 
Xie Yuchen as Xiaoqiu 
Qin Junze as Li Gen 
Jin Mi as A'naba 
Sui Xinran as Zhaxida

Production 
Though the original novel contains elements of time slip, but due to regulations by SAFRT, it was removed and changes were made to the script.

See also
Scarlet Heart

References

External links
 

2017 Chinese television series debuts
Chinese romance television series
Chinese historical television series
Alternate history television series
Television series set in the Qing dynasty
Television shows based on Chinese novels
Chinese web series
Tencent original programming
2017 web series debuts